Cyrtodactylus tripuraensis is a species of gecko endemic to Tripura, Northeast India.

References

Cyrtodactylus
Reptiles described in 2018
Endemic fauna of India
Reptiles of India